Sir John Gladstone Black McDonald (6 December 1898 – 23 April 1977) was 37th Premier of Victoria (leading the Country Party) from 27 June 1950 to 17 December 1952, except for a few days in October 1952 when Thomas Hollway led a brief Electoral Reform League government. McDonald  came to office by defeating Hollway's Liberals, but was himself vanquished by the Labor Party under John Cain in 1952.

McDonald was also Deputy Premier of Victoria from November 1947 to December 1948 under Premier Thomas Hollway.

McDonald was President of the Goulburn Valley Second Eighteens Football Association from 1927 to 1933.

Early life
McDonald was born in Falkirk, Scotland, the son of a grocer, and was educated at Carmuirs School. After the death of his father, McDonald and his family emigrated to Australia in 1912 and settled in Shepparton, Victoria where they ran a dairy farm.

On 4 March 1916, McDonald (who was 17 at the time) enlisted in the Australian Imperial Force during World War I, in which he served with the 37th Battalion on the Western Front.

References

|-

1898 births
1977 deaths
Premiers of Victoria
Members of the Victorian Legislative Assembly
National Party of Australia members of the Parliament of Victoria
Treasurers of Victoria
Deputy Premiers of Victoria
Australian Knights Bachelor
Australian politicians awarded knighthoods
Australian Army soldiers
Australian military personnel of World War I
Scottish emigrants to Australia
People from Falkirk
People from Shepparton
20th-century Australian politicians